The USL W League (USLW) is a pre-professional women's soccer league in the United States which began play in May 2022. It was announced on June 8, 2021 by the United Soccer League with eight founding clubs. It follows the USL W-League, a similar league that existed from 1995 to 2015. At launch, the USL said the inaugural season would include at least 30 teams.

History
The league was originally announced with eight clubs, six of which would be women's sides for existing men's USL teams, and two of which would be entirely new franchises. The inaugural season began on May 6, 2022 with 44 teams.

Teams

Current teams

Location map

Champions

Finals

W League MVPs

See also 
 Women's soccer in the United States
 National Women's Soccer League
 USL Super League

References

External links 
 

Women's soccer leagues in the United States
Sports leagues established in 2021
2021 establishments in the United States
United Soccer League
Amateur association football